Shilpi Marwaha is an actor in the Delhi Theatre Circuit who first performed in 2008. She was a street theatre activist during the "anti corruption movement" in Delhi and the protests held at Rastrapati Bhawan, where she raised her voice against the 2012 Delhi gang rape and murder known as the "Nirbhaya" or "Damini" case. She has also worked in mainstream cinema in the Bollywood film, Raanjhanaa as Rashmi, Abhay Deol's sister, directed by Anand L. Rai in 2013, Bhoomiyude Avakashikal (The Inheritors of the Earth), directed by T. V. Chandran, "Widow of Silence" as Aasiya directed by Praveen Morchhale in 2018 and "Chhapaak" directed by Meghna Gulzar in 2020. She was awarded first Sarla Birla Award for her contribution to theatre, AAS Excellence Award 2016 for her participation in women empowerment initiatives, DCW award from Delhi Commission for Women and 'Devi' award from Indian Express Group for her contribution in women empowerment through theatre.

Personal life and background  
Shilpi was born and brought up in Delhi and studied Commerce at Kamla Nehru College, University of Delhi. She was active in campus theatre. She did many street and stage plays in DU.

Acting in theatre 

Marwaha started her career as a theatre actor in Delhi with Asmita Theatre Group in 2008. She was trained under theatre director Arvind Gaur, and participated in his theatre workshop in college. She coordinated theatre workshops and directed workshop plays.

Her major plays are Dario Fo and Franca Rame's A Woman Alone, Bertolt Brecht's Ramkali (The Good Person of Szechwan), Mahesh Dattani's Final Solutions and 30 days in September, Girish Karnad's Rakt Kalyan, Swadesh Deepak's Court Martial, Rajesh Kumar's Ambedkar aur Gandhi, Mohan Rakesh's Lehro ke Rajhans, Ashok Lal's Ek Mamooli Aadmi, Unsuni (based on Harsh Mandar's book & scripted by Mallika Sarabhai), Vijay Mishra's "Tat Niranjana“, Dario Fo's adaptation Operation Three Star, based on Accidental Death of an Anarchist, Govind Purushottam Deshpande's Raastey, Dario Fo's Can't Pay won't Pay (Hindi adaptation by Amitabh Srivastava) and Mahesh Bhatt's The Last Salute, written by Rajesh Kumar. Shilpi has also worked with RJ Raunac on dramatic reading of Asghar Wajahat's stories.

Apart from acting, she has written five stories, all of which have been staged in Delhi.: "Apratyaksh", a love story of a eunuch, "Kaash", an intercaste love saga, "Purity" on the slut-shaming tendencies of society and "Rangmanch", elucidating the struggles involved in the life of an aspiring actor trying to fulfil his dream and "Asifa" on child abuse."Ehsaas" a solo act written and performed by Shilpi depicts a young girl's struggle to express her love and desire for other women.

Shilpi was a part of the national award-winning documentary film Daughters of Mother India and has worked with Oscars|Oscar award]]-winning director Ross Kaufman. She won the best actress award in 2010 in the "International short and sweet festival".

She participated in theatre workshops in various colleges in Delhi and elsewhere including Delhi University, IIT and IIM, and has judged numbers of events on stage and street plays in different colleges and universities across the nation.

Street theatre 
Shilpi Marwaha performed thousands of street plays in Delhi NCR and other states, based on social issues including corruption, women's empowerment, environment, road rage, Dastak, anti-ragging, LGBTQ, communal harmony, Female foeticide, child education, mental health, gender equality, domestic violence, child labour, poverty, drugs, inter-faith, etc. Marwaha is active in the Social Awareness movement, and participated in the women's safety movement to raise voice for domestic workers and in anti-corruption movement etc.

Starting theatre group 

In the year 2016, Shilpi faced workplace sexual harassment from the director of theatre group where she worked for almost a decade; she left the group and was joined by other senior actors who also decided to leave.

Shilpi started Sukhmanch Theatre in March 2017 in the memory of her late mother, whose name "Sukhvarsha" inspired the name of the group.  she was working as creative head and director of the group.

Some roles 

 "Indira" by Nishi Chawla
Gaaye by Rajesh Kumar
 Court Martial by Swadesh Deepak
 Kabira Khada Bazaar Mein by Bhisham Sahni
 Tafteesh by Rajesh Kumar
 Kaal Kothari by Swadesh Deepak
 A Woman Alone by Dario Fo & Franca Rame
 "Kasturba Vs Gandhi" by Dr Nishi Chawla
 Gagan Damama Bajyo by Piyush Mishra
 Ramleela by Rakesh Veda
 Seven steps around the fire by Mahesh Dattani

Filmography 

 2012 – Bhoomiyude Avakashikal
 2013 – Raanjhanaa as Rashmi, Abhay Deol's sister.
2018 - Widow of Silence
2020 - Chhapaak
2022 - Shabaash Mithu as Sukumari Marwaha 
2023 - Banda Singh

References

External links

Facebook
Twitter
Sukhmanch Theatre

Actresses from Delhi
Indian stage actresses
Indian film actresses
Living people
Delhi University alumni
Punjabi people
1988 births
Actresses in Hindi cinema
Actresses in Malayalam cinema
21st-century Indian actresses